Messmer High School is a private, Roman Catholic high school in Milwaukee, Wisconsin, United States.  It is located in the Roman Catholic Archdiocese of Milwaukee.

Messmer High School was established in 1926 as Diocesan High School. It was renamed after Archbishop Sebastian Messmer in 1928.

Notable alumni
 Ishmael "IshDarr" Ali, rapper
 Joseph P. Graw, Minnesota state representative and businessman
 Bob Heinz, former NFL football player who played for the Miami Dolphins and the Washington Redskins
 Todd Frohwirth, former Major League Baseball pitcher
 John "JJ" Johnson, NBA basketball player, First Team All-American at University of Iowa
 Ronald G. Parys, Wisconsin State Assemblyman and Senator

References

External links
 School website
 GreatSchools Inc.

Roman Catholic Archdiocese of Milwaukee
High schools in Milwaukee
Catholic secondary schools in Wisconsin
Educational institutions established in 1926
1926 establishments in Wisconsin